Landsbro is a locality situated in Vetlanda Municipality, Jönköping County, Sweden with 1,426 inhabitants in 2010.

Notable people
 Johan Franzén, professional ice hockey player
 Erik Karlsson, professional ice hockey player

References 

Populated places in Jönköping County
Populated places in Vetlanda Municipality